Gerald Budge Folland is an American mathematician and a professor of mathematics at the University of Washington. 
He is the author of several textbooks on mathematical analysis. His areas of interest include harmonic analysis (on both Euclidean space and Lie groups), differential equations, and mathematical physics. The title of his doctoral dissertation at Princeton University (1971) is "The Tangential Cauchy-Riemann Complex on Spheres".

In 2012 he became a fellow of the American Mathematical Society.

Publications and books
 A Guide to Advanced Real Analysis, Washington, D.C. : Mathematical Association of America, 2009.
 Quantum Field Theory : A Tourist Guide for Mathematicians, Providence, R.I. : American Mathematical Society, 2008.
 Advanced Calculus, Prentice-Hall, 2002.
 Real Analysis: Modern Techniques and their Applications (2nd ed.), John Wiley, 1999, .
 "The uncertainty principle: a mathematical survey", J. Fourier Anal. Appl. 4 (1997), 207–238 (with A. Sitaram).
 Introduction to Partial Differential Equations (2nd ed.), Princeton University Press, 1995.
 A Course in Abstract Harmonic Analysis, CRC Press, 1995.
 Fourier Analysis and Its Applications, Pacific Grove, Calif. : Wadsworth & Brooks/Cole Advanced Books & Software, 1992.
 Harmonic Analysis in Phase Space, Princeton University Press, 1989.
 Lectures on Partial Differential Equations : lectures delivered at the Indian Institute of Science, Bangalore, Springer, 1983.
 Hardy Spaces on Homogeneous Groups (with  Elias M. Stein), Princeton University Press, 1982.
 "Estimates for the ∂b complex and analysis on the Heisenberg group", Comm. Pure Appl. Math. 27 (1974), 429–522 (with E. M. Stein)

References
 .

External links
 Jerry Folland's Personal Homepage
 Jerry Folland's Official Homepage
 

20th-century American mathematicians
21st-century American mathematicians
Fellows of the American Mathematical Society
Living people
1947 births
Princeton University alumni
University of Washington faculty